William Robert Hudson (born March 30, 1989) is an American former professional basketball player. He played college basketball for Oakland University where he broke the school record with 137 games played and 345 offensive rebounds.

High school career
Hudson attended Middleton High School in Middleton, Wisconsin where he was a three-time all-conference selection and a three-time letterwinner in basketball for head coach Kevin Bavery. As a junior in 2005–06, he averaged 14 points, eight rebounds and four blocks per game.

In November 2006, Hudson signed a National Letter of Intent to play college basketball for Oakland University.

As a senior in 2006–07, Hudson averaged 21 points, 13 rebounds and five blocks per game, leading Madison to a 19–5 record and the school's highest ever ranking at No. 5 while winning the league's scoring title and earning first-team all-state by state coaches and second-team by the Associated Press.

College career
In his freshman season at Oakland, Hudson played 31 games (two starts) while averaging 3.5 points and 3.0 rebounds in 12.2 minutes per game. On November 11, 2007, he scored a season-high 12 points and three blocks versus Adrian College.

In his sophomore season, Hudson led the team with .682 field goal percentage while recording 25 blocks on the season. In 36 games (24 starts), he averaged 7.4 points and 4.6 rebounds in 22.1 minutes per game.

In his junior season, Hudson led the team for the second straight season with a .638 field goal percentage and finished fifth in The Summit League with 2.9 offensive rebounds per game. In 35 games (24 starts), he averaged 6.0 points and 4.9 rebounds in 21.6 minutes per game.

In his senior season, Hudson earned second-team All-Summit League honors. He set a single-season school record with 133 offensive rebounds while also ranking second in The Summit League in field goal percentage (.645) and led the league with 3.8 offensive rebounds per game. On January 29, 2011, he tied his career high 22 points against Oral Roberts. In 35 games (all starts), he averaged 12.6 points and 7.2 rebounds in 31.3 minutes per game. He became the 29th player to reach 1,000 points for his career, finishing 28th with 1,023.

College statistics

|-
| style="text-align:left;"| 2007–08
| style="text-align:left;"| Oakland
| 31 || 2 || 12.2 || .532 || .000 || .575 || 3.0 || .2 || .3 || .4 || 3.5
|-
| style="text-align:left;"| 2008–09
| style="text-align:left;"| Oakland
| 36 || 24 || 22.1 || .682 || .000 || .671 || 4.6 || .8 || .7 || .7 || 7.4
|-
| style="text-align:left;"| 2009–10
| style="text-align:left;"| Oakland
| 35 || 24 || 21.6 || .638 || .000 || .616 || 4.9 || .5 || .8 || .5 || 6.0
|-
| style="text-align:left;"| 2010–11
| style="text-align:left;"| Oakland
| 35 || 35 || 31.3 || .645 || .000 || .714 || 7.2 || .8 || .7 || .9 || 12.6
|-

Professional career
Hudson went undrafted in the 2011 NBA draft. In August 2011, he signed with the Gold Coast Blaze for the 2011–12 NBL season.

In July 2012, Hudson signed with the New Zealand Breakers for the 2012–13 NBL season.

On December 30, 2013, Hudson signed with ASVEL Basket of France as a short-term injury replacement. On April 2, 2014, he was released by ASVEL after playing in 10 games.

On August 18, 2014, Hudson signed with Spirou Charleroi of Belgium for the 2014–15 season. However, after just four games, he left Spirou on October 16, 2014 due to personal reasons.

Personal
Hudson is the son David and Lynn Hudson, and has a brother named Andrew.

References

External links
Eurobasket.com profile
Oakland bio

1989 births
Living people
American expatriate basketball people in Australia
American expatriate basketball people in Belgium
American expatriate basketball people in France
American expatriate basketball people in New Zealand
ASVEL Basket players
Basketball players from Wisconsin
Centers (basketball)
Gold Coast Blaze players
New Zealand Breakers players
Oakland Golden Grizzlies men's basketball players
Power forwards (basketball)
Spirou Charleroi players
Sportspeople from Madison, Wisconsin
American men's basketball players